The Sapua Dam is built on a small river know as 'Sapua' which is one of the tributaries of  Mahanadi River. It is located near Rasol in the Hindol block of Odisha’s Dhenkanal district . The Dam built at the starting point of the river.

Construction
The Dam is built as part of a Minor Irrigation project known as Sapua-Badajore Irrigation Project. Although the project was planned much before, the construction started in the year of 1993 and got fully completed in the year of 2006. With a maximum water storage level of 170 meter, the length of the dam is 1290 meter and height of 26 meter. The total command are of the project is 3682 hectares.

Tourism

Nestled around 90 KM away from Bhubaneswar, lies an architectural marvel that is awe-inspiring in its grandeur. Lying in the heart of a saal forest, it is one of the best places in Odisha that combines man-made skills with the charm of nature. The dam overlooks a beautiful bridge and the verdant mountains. This area is full of green forest and a very good picnic spot. Once it was a barred area, but now this zone is first choice for camping, sightseeing and picnic place by tourists.

The place is well connected by Road and 5 KM away from  Rasol (National Highway 655 (India)). People from all across the state come here to see the momentary view through out the year.

Naming
Most of tourists assumes, because of the snake like structure of the riverside fixed gates, the name 'Sapua Dam' is derived. Rather, it is because of the river, which name it self is 'Sapua'. However, as per local tales, the river flows with a large snake like bed, from which the naming of the river is derived.

References

Dams in Odisha
Dams on the Mahanadi River
Dams completed in 2006
2006 establishments in Orissa